Pseudonocardia ailaonensis is a bacterium from the genus of Pseudonocardia which has been isolated from forest soil in Yunnan in China.

References

Pseudonocardia
Bacteria described in 2008